Hunton, as a person, may refer to:

Addie Waites Hunton (1866–1943), American suffragist, race and gender activist, and educator
Emma Hunton (born 1991), American musical theatre actress (Spring Awakening, Next to Normal, RENT, Witness Uganda, Wicked)
Eppa Hunton (1822-1908), an American politician and general
Eppa Hunton Jr. (1855-1932), American attorney
Eppa Hunton IV (1904-1976), American attorney
John C. Hunton (1839-1928), American Confederate veteran, pioneer, and rancher
Philip Hunton (c.1600-1682) was an English clergyman and political writer

Hunton, as a place, may refer to:

Hunton, Kent, England, United Kingdom
Hunton, North Yorkshire, a village in Richmondshire, North Yorkshire, England, United Kingdom
Hunton, Hampshire, a small village near Winchester, Hampshire, United Kingdom

Hunton, as a company, may refer to:

Hunton & Williams LLP, a U.S. law firm